Oliha is a surname found in Nigeria. Notable people with the surname include:

Aigbe Oliha (born 1993), Nigerian footballer
Thompson Oliha (1968–2013), Nigerian footballer

Surnames of Nigerian origin